Yevgeni Ivanovich Zhelyakov (born 13 July 1976) is a Russian professional football coach and a former player. He is an assistant coach with FC Salyut Belgorod.

Club career
Zhelyakov appeared in four Russian Football National League matches while with FC Dynamo Bryansk.

External links

1976 births
Living people
Russian footballers
Association football goalkeepers
FC Tyumen players
FC Khimik-Arsenal players
FC Sakhalin Yuzhno-Sakhalinsk players
FC Slavyansk Slavyansk-na-Kubani players
FC Dynamo Bryansk players
FC Lokomotiv Kaluga players